Barry Clark may refer to:

Barry Clark (EastEnders), a character in the BBC TV series EastEnders
Barry Clark (rally driver) (born 1982), British rally driver
Barry Clark (tenor) (born 1950), tenor who has appeared with the D'Oyly Carte Opera Company and the Carl Rosa Opera Company
Barry G. Clark (born 1938), American astronomer

See also
 Barry Clarke (disambiguation)